Tia is the goddess of peaceful death in the Haida mythology. She is considered to be part of a duality. Her counterpart is Ta'xet, the Haida God of violent death.

References

Goddesses of the indigenous peoples of North America
Death goddesses
Haida goddesses